Amherst is a city in Lorain County, Ohio, United States. The population was 12,681 at the 2020 census.

History

The original village, which eventually became known as Amherst, was established/founded by pioneer settler Jacob Shupe  (who came to this area in 1811; however, what would become the specific “downtown” area was settled by Josiah Harris in 1818), although the original tiny village was first known only as "Amherst Corners" in the early-1830s. When the village-plat was officially recorded in 1836, it was simply named the "town plat of Amherst", but became "Amherstville" circa-1839, and was later changed to "North Amherst", until finally again simply 'Amherst' in 1909. (The original 1820s postal-name of the village's first post-office was "Plato"; and the village's post-office retained that postal-name into the 1840s, even after the local-government name of the village officially became 'Amherstville' by 1840.)

The village is often said to have had its beginnings as early as 1811, because land which was settled by pioneer Jacob Shupe, in the "Beaver Creek Settlement" (about a mile north of the later village site), was eventually included into the Amherst city-limits. Shupe's pioneering efforts within the township, which included constructing his own grist-mill/saw-mill and distillery, certainly added to the area's desirability for later pioneers to settle here).
By the latter 1800s, Amherst acquired the title Sandstone Center of the World.
Many early buildings are constructed of native sandstone, and the quarries were also an important source of grindstones. There were nine sandstone quarries in the area operating at the peak of production. Cleveland Quarries Company, established in 1868, no longer quarries in Amherst but is still actively quarrying Berea Sandstone.

Geography
Amherst, part of the Greater Cleveland area, is located at  (41.399993, -82.226201).

Climate
Amherst possesses a humid continental climate (Köppen climate classification Dfa) typical of much of the Central United States, with very warm to hot, humid summers and cold winters with moderate snow.

Amherst is located in Hardiness Zone 6a/6b. A recent trend since the Hardiness rezoning is the discovery that certain tropical plants like the Needle Palm, Chinese Windmill Palm and Fiber Banana trees can grow in Amherst with some protection.

Demographics

2010 census
As of the census of 2010, there were 12,021 people, 4,772 households, and 3,463 families residing in the city. The racial makeup of the city was 95.7% White, 0.7% African American, 0.2% Native American, 0.7% Asian, 1.0% from other races, and 1.7% from two or more races. Hispanic or Latino of any race were 5.3% of the population.

There were 4,772 households, of which 30.8% had children under the age of 18 living with them, 57.7% were married couples living together, 10.7% had a female householder with no husband present, 4.1% had a male householder with no wife present, and 27.4% were non-families. 23.7% of all households were made up of individuals, and 11.5% had someone living alone who was 65 years of age or older. The average household size was 2.50 and the average family size was 2.95.

The median age in the city was 45 years. 22.1% of residents were under the age of 18; 7.3% were between the ages of 18 and 24; 20.7% were from 25 to 44; 32.3% were from 45 to 64; and 17.8% were 65 years of age or older. The gender makeup of the city was 48.3% male and 51.7% female.

2000 census
As of the census of 2000, there were 11,797 people, 4,459 households, and 3,388 families residing in the city. The population density was 1,646.1 people per square mile (635.3/km2). There were 4,603 housing units at an average density of 642.3 per square mile (247.9/km2). The racial makeup of the city was 96.84% White, 0.53% African American, 0.14% Native American, 0.73% Asian, 0.01% Pacific Islander, 0.78% from other races, and 0.98% from two or more races. Hispanic or Latino of any race were 2.93% of the population.

There were 4,459 households, out of which 34.4% had children under the age of 18 living with them, 65.6% were married couples living together, 7.9% had a female householder with no husband present, and 24.0% were non-families. Twenty-one.six percent of all households were made up of individuals, and 11.1% had someone living alone who was 65 years of age or older. The average household size was 2.61, and the average family size was 3.04.

In the city the population was spread out, with 26.0% under the age of 18, 5.6% from 18 to 24, 27.3% from 25 to 44, 25.4% from 45 to 64, and 15.7% who were 65 years of age or older. The median age was 40 years. For every 100 females, there were 92.2 males. For every 100 females age 18 and over, there were 87.9 males.

The median income for a household in the city was $53,516, and the median income for a family was $57,990. Males had a median income of $47,750 versus $27,880 for females. The per capita income for the city was $25,565. About 1.2% of families and 2.1% of the population were below the poverty line, including 0.3% of those under age 18 and 3.5% of those age 65 or over.

Government
The government in Amherst has traditionally been balanced between the local Democratic and the Republican Parties.

The political makeup of the city is -
 Democrats:  56.1%
 Republicans:  43.4%

Since becoming a city in 1960, the political power was balanced until the late 1960s and early 1970s when the Republicans led by Mayor Anthony DePaola dominated until 1983 when Democrat John Jaworski was elected mayor.

The city's leadership currently includes:

Transportation

By far the most common mode of transportation to, from or within Amherst is by car. However the downtown area is walkable. State Route 2 runs west to east through the northern portion of Amherst providing access to downtown Cleveland (38 minutes), its suburbs and Sandusky, Ohio. There are two exit/entrance ramps in the city (Oak Point Road and State Route 58). The Ohio Turnpike also runs west to east along the City's southern border and there is one (exit/entrance) ramp just south of the city in Amherst Township at State Route 58. Parts of the city are also served by the Lorain County Transit system. Cleveland Hopkins (CLE) is the nearest International airport; it is located approximately 35 minutes east of the city.

Business
Amherst is home to a Nordson factory that manufactures various products, as well as KTM-Sportmotorcycle America's Corporate office. In the city's scenic downtown section, Ben Franklin's dime store sells many types of fish and aquarium accessories, model cars, puzzles, and the like. Amherst is also home to Ziggy's, a bar and grill that President Obama visited in 2012. Also within Amherst is Kiedrowski's Simply Delicious Bakery, who are famous for inventing the "Snoogle" pastry and was named "The Best Bakery in America" by The Baking Channel in 2011.

Growth
A recent housing boom has created demand for new retail areas in Amherst. Target has recently opened inside the city limits.

Notable people
 Guy Carlton, weighlifter, Olympic medal winner
 Mike Finley, author of over 110 books
 Jim Hayford, basketball head coach, Seattle University
 Joel Hills Johnson, inventor, Mormon pioneer, published poet and gospel hymn writer, politician and judge
 Mika Johnson, filmmaker and musician
 Jerry Lawler, professional wrestler and commentator
 John Penton, motorcycle enduro racer and member of the AMA Motorcycle Hall of Fame
 Ryan Rua, professional baseball player
 Henry Dwight Stratton, founder of Bryant & Stratton College

In popular culture
 Amherst, Ohio was the setting for the 2015 film The Bronze

Notes

References

External links 

 City website
 Amherst Schools

Cities in Ohio
Cities in Lorain County, Ohio
Populated places established in 1836
Cleveland metropolitan area
1836 establishments in Ohio